WXGL (107.3 FM) is a commercial radio station licensed to St. Petersburg, Florida, and serving the Tampa Bay Area.  It is owned by Cox Media Group and calls itself "The Eagle - Tampa Bay's Classic Hits."  WXGL airs a classic hits radio format that leans toward classic rock, primarily from the 1980s and 1990s, although occasionally going older.  Unlike rival Classic Hits station 104.7 WRBQ, The Eagle does not play pop or dance music from artists such as Madonna or Michael Jackson.

WXGL's studios are located in St. Petersburg on 4th Street North.  The transmitter site is off Burbank Road in Oldsmar.

Streaming
In addition to the Eagle website, streaming via the iHeartRadio website and smartphone app was available since summer 2012. Subsequently, a smartphone app solely for "The Eagle" was launched the following summer.

References

External links 

XGL (FM)
Cox Media Group
Metromedia
Classic hits radio stations in the United States
1965 establishments in Florida
Radio stations established in 1965